Brandin Cote (born April 21, 1981) is a Canadian retired professional ice hockey centre who last played for the Fischtown Pinguins in the German 2nd Bundesliga in 2008–09. In 2002, Cote signed with the Chicago Blackhawks as a free agent. He played three seasons for Norfolk then moved to England to play for the Nottingham Panthers. He returned for one more season with Norfolk, then played for the Texas Wildcatters. He returned to Europe for two seasons before retiring in 2009.

Cote was born in Swift Current, Saskatchewan. He played junior for the Spokane Chiefs of the Western Hockey League.

Following his pro career, Cote played one season of senior hockey with the Bentley Generals of the Chinook Hockey League.  In September 2012, he was named as the head coach of the Generals and led them to an Allan Cup championship in his first season behind the bench.

Awards
2001 - WHL West Second Team All-Star
2002 - CHL Humanitarian of the Year Award
2002 - WHL Doug Wickenheiser Memorial Trophy

Career statistics

References

External links

1981 births
Canadian ice hockey centres
Ice hockey people from Saskatchewan
Living people
Norfolk Admirals players
Nottingham Panthers players
People from Swift Current
Spokane Chiefs players
Texas Wildcatters players
Canadian expatriate ice hockey players in England